Gaither Homecoming is the name applied to a series of videos, music recordings and concerts, which are organized, promoted and usually presented by Christian music songwriter and impresario Bill Gaither. To date, the Gaither Homecoming title is applied to more than 134 videos (most of which are not listed in the 'Videography' section), hundreds of music recordings, and an annual concert tour that drew more than half a million fans in 2004 (the most recent year for which statistics are available).

Beginnings
On February 19, 1992, the Gaither Vocal Band had just wrapped up a recording session in a Nashville, Tennessee, working on an album called Homecoming, which featured many of the great voices of southern gospel music: The Speers, the Gatlins, Jake Hess, The Cathedrals, Howard & Vestal Goodman, Buck Rambo, Eva Mae Lefevre, James Blackwood, Hovie Lister, Jim Hill, and J.D. Sumner & The Stamps. After the session, the artists stayed around to chat, swap stories and sing old standards around the piano. The impromptu session was recorded on video and later published. The recording was so well received that Gaither began a series of professionally produced videos with larger gatherings of gospel musicians.

Format
The format for almost all of the videos in the series is very similar. A studio set or concert stage is home to a group of several dozen singers, with the front row featuring artists with longstanding and legendary careers in Southern Gospel music. They would be joined by younger artists, some of them up-and-coming acts in the Gaither Music Group publishing stable. Gaither would lead the group in several songs, with soloists and groups featured in additional songs. Comments by veteran singers, who would reminisce about their careers, are a staple of the series. In later videos, the inevitability of death found its way into the videos, as segments remembering artists who had died since the previous taping were featured.

Most videos also have accompanying CDs which can be purchased in a set or separately.

The videos and CDs regularly top sales charts, even many years after the series' inception and after the death of many favorite artists. The most recent videos, Gaither Homecoming Tour: Live From Toronto and Canadian Homecoming, were first and third, respectively, on Billboard's music video chart, and the companion CDs also hit the CCM charts.  More recently, the 2007 recording of "How Great Thou Art" was nominated for a Dove Award.

Concert series
In 1996, the video series gave birth to a concert tour, with a format similar to the videos but usually performed "in the round" in arenas. The concert dates are normally on Fridays and Saturdays, usually in separate cities.

In 2004, the Gaither Homecoming concert tour ranked 16th in Pollstar rankings of all tours, beating out pop music heavyweights such as Elton John, Fleetwood Mac and Rod Stewart.

Television series
Many of the video series have been repackaged into a series of hour-long or half-hour-long television shows (similar to an infomercial). They can be found on the following Christian or family-oriented cable/satellite channels. (There is also an Internet TV channel – gaither.tv)

In the U.S.

Christian Television Network (CTN)
PBS (titled Classic Gospel)
RFD-TV
TBN (titled Precious Memories)
TCT
Total Living Network (TLN)
Heartland
UplifTV

In Canada

CTS
Grace TV
Miracle Channel
VisionTV

Cruises
The Gaither Homecoming series has branched out into twice-yearly cruises. One cruise normally sails to Alaska in September, and the other to tropical ports in February.

It was on one of these cruises, in 2006, where regular pianist Anthony Burger, a longtime favorite of the Homecoming series, collapsed on-stage as a result of a heart attack while accompanying Gaither, his wife Gloria and the rest of the Homecoming Friends.

In 2009, for the first time, a Homecoming cruise was recorded for DVD/CD releases. Alaskan Cruise Homecoming and Majesty were released in January 2011.

Videography

1991: Homecoming
1992: A Praise Gathering
1992: Reunion
1993: Turn Your Radio On
1993: Old Friends
1994: A Christmas Homecoming
1994: Landmark
1994: Precious Memories
1995: All Day Singin' with Dinner on the Ground
1995: The Sweetest Song I Know
1995: Revival
1995: Holy Ground
1995: Ryman Gospel Reunion
1996: When All God's Singers Get Home
1996: Sunday Meetin' Time
1996: Sing Your Blues Away
1996: Moments To Remember
1996: Something Beautiful
1996: Homecoming Texas Style
1996: Joy To The World
1996: Joy in the Camp
1997: Back Home Again in Indiana
1997: Feelin' At Home
1997: This Is My Story
1997: Special Homecoming Moments (certified platinum)
1998: Gaither Homecoming Celebration (recorded live on New Year's; released in January 2012)
1998: Singin' With The Saints
1998: Down By The Tabernacle
1998: Rivers Of Joy
1998: Hawaiian Homecoming
1998: Marching To Zion
1998: Atlanta Homecoming (at the Georgia Dome)
1998: All Day Singin' At The Dome (Atlanta)
1999: Singin' In My Soul
1999: So Glad!
1999: Sweet, Sweet Spirit
1999: Kennedy Center Homecoming
1999: Mountain Homecoming (Blue Ridge Mountains)
1999: I'll Meet You on the Mountain
1999: The Cathedrals: A Farewell Celebration
2000: Good News
2000: Memphis Homecoming
2000: Oh, My Glory!
2000: Harmony in the Heartland
2000: Irish Homecoming (in Belfast)
2000: Whispering Hope
2000: Christmas in the Country
2001: Christmas... A Time for Joy
2001: What a Time!
2001: London Homecoming
2001: Old Friends Quartet: Encore
2001: Gaither Vocal Band: I Do Believe
2001: A Billy Graham Music Homecoming, Vol. 1 & 2
2001: Journey to the Sky (certified gold)
2001: Passin' the Faith Along (certified gold)
2002: Homecoming Bloopers
2002: Freedom Band
2002: I'll Fly Away
2002: New Orleans Homecoming
2002: God Bless America (at Carnegie Hall)
2002: Let Freedom Ring (at Carnegie Hall)
2003: Going Home (certified platinum)
2003: Heaven 
2003: Australian Homecoming
2003: Red Rocks Homecoming
2003: Rocky Mountain Homecoming
2003: A Gospel Bluegrass Homecoming, Vol. 1 & 2
2004: Build a Bridge (at The Potter's House in Dallas, Texas)
2004: Dottie Rambo with Homecoming Friends
2004: We Will Stand (at The Potter's House)
2004: Tribute To Howard & Vestal Goodman
2004: Tribute to Jake Hess
2004: The Best of Mark Lowry and Bill Gaither, Vol. 1 & 2
2005: Church In The Wildwood (certified platinum)
2005: Hymns (certified platinum)
2005: Israel Homecoming (certified platinum)
2005: Jerusalem Homecoming (certified platinum)
2005: The Best of Guy Penrod
2005: A Tribute to George Younce
2005: Ernie Haase & Signature Sound
2006: Canadian Homecoming (certified gold)
2006: Live from Toronto (certified gold)
2006: Christmas in South Africa
2006: Homecoming Christmas – Live From South Africa
2007: South African Homecoming
2007: Love Can Turn The World – Live From South Africa
2007: Amazing Grace (certified gold)
2007: How Great Thou Art (certified gold)
2007: Ernie Haase & Signature Sound: Get Away, Jordan
2007: Gaither Vocal Band and Ernie Haase & Signature Sound...TOGETHER
2008: A Campfire Homecoming
2008: Homecoming Picnic
2008: Rock of Ages
2008: Country Bluegrass Homecoming, Vol. 1 & 2
2008: Ernie Haase & Signature Sound: Dream On (Live from Chicago)
2009: Nashville Homecoming (at the Grand Ole Opry stage)
2009: Joy in My Heart
2009: Gaither Vocal Band: Reunion, Vol. 1 & 2
2010: Giving Thanks
2010: Count Your Blessings
2010: Ernie Haase & Signature Sound: A Tribute to the Cathedral Quartet
2011: Alaskan Homecoming (cruise)
2011: Majesty (Alaskan cruise)
2011: Tent Revival Homecoming (at the Billy Graham Library)
2011: The Old Rugged Cross (at the Billy Graham Library)
2011: The Best of David Phelps
2012: Gaither Homecoming Celebration (filmed in 1998, never-before-seen material)
2013: Gaither Vocal Band: Pure and Simple, Vol. 1 & 2
2013: Women of Homecoming, Vol: 1 & 2
2014: Ernie Haase & Signature Sound: Oh, What A Savior
2014: Cathedrals Family Reunion
2016: Mark Lowry: Dogs Go to Heaven
2016: Circuit Rider
2016: The Longer I Serve Him
2017: Give the World a Smile
2017: Sweeter as the Days Go By
2020: The Longer I Serve Him
2021: Glorious Church (filmed in 2001, never-before-seen material)
2023: "Hallelujah Homecoming"
2023: "Power in the Blood"

Hall of Honor Series
1994: The Goodman Family: The Journey (Vol. 1)
1994: The Speers Family: A Love Story (Vol. 2)
1994: Hovie Lister & The Statesmen: An American Classic (Vol. 3)
1994: O Happy Day: Old-Time Southern Singing Convention (Vol. 4)
1994: The Cathedrals: Fifty Faithful Years (Vol. 5)
1994: The Best of the Gospel Singing Jubilee: Number. 1-4 (Vol. 6)
1995: Cynthia Clawson: Thank God for The Promise of Spring (Vol. 7)
1995: The Blackwood Brothers: Family Reunion (Vol. 8)
1995: Jus' Jake and a Few Close Friends (Vol. 9)
1995: The Sweetest Song I Know (Vol. 10)
1997: The Gatlin Brothers: Come Home (Vol. 11)
1997: J.D. Sumner & the Stamps: God Still Lives in This Old House (Vol. 12)
1997: The LeFevres: A Song in your Heart at Night (Vol. 13)
1998: The Best of Jessy Dixon: Sanctuary (Vol. 14)

==Featured artists==
An asterisk (*) indicates that the artist is deceased.
Numbers indicate how many videos the artist has appeared in as a featured performer.

 Aaron Wilburn (2001–2020*) 3 (died Nov. 27, 2020)
Acoustix (2007–) 2
Albertina Walker (2004*) 2 (died October 8, 2010)
 Alicia Williamson (2000–) 10
 Allen Asbury (2003–) 2
 Allison Durham Speer (1999–) 9
Alvin Slaughter (2004)
 Amber Nelon Thompson (2003–) 6
 Amy Gaither-Hayes (1999–) 3
Amy Grant (2013) 2
 Amy Lambert (1998–) 9
 Amy Rouse (2001–) 3
Andraé Crouch (1999–2015*) 4 (died Jan. 8, 2015)
 Angela Primm (2002–) 11
 Ann Downing (1992–) 26
Anthony Burger (1994–2006*) 18 (died Feb. 22, 2006)
 Armond Morales (2002–*) 2 (died Dec. 5, 2022)
 Arnolds, The (2002)
Avalon (2001–) 2
 Babbie Mason (1995–) 11
 Becky Isaacs Bowman (1999–) 10
 Ben Isaacs (1998–) 5
Ben Speer (1992–2011*) 36 (died April 7, 2017)
 Benjy Gaither (2002–) 4
Beverly Crawford (2004)
 Billy Blackwood (1996)
 Bishops, The (1995–) 5
The Blackwood Brothers (2000–) 2
 Bob Cain (1996–2000*) 10 (died August 30, 2000)
 Bonnie Keen (1999–) 7
The Booth Brothers (2002–) 14
Boots Randolph (2004*) (died July 3, 2007)
Brenda Lee (2007)
Brent Swanner (2000-2004)
 Brian Free & Assurance (2009)
Brock Speer (1991-1999*) 5 (died March 19, 1999)
 Buck Rambo (1991, 2011*) 2 (died Feb. 21, 2016)
Buddy Greene (1994–) 30
 Buddy Mullins (1995–) 14
Calvin Newton (1994–) 5
Carman (1998*) (died Feb. 21, 2021)
 Candy Hemphill Christmas (1995–) 17
The Cathedrals (1991–1999) 9
CeCe Winans (2001–) 2
 Charles Johnson (1998)
 Charlotte Ritchie (1995–) 34
Cherryholmes (2008–) 3
Chonda Pierce (1998–) 2
 Chuck Wagon Gang, The (2011–) 2
Cissy Houston (2004)
Cliff Barrows (2001*) 3 (died Nov. 15, 2016)
Colet Selwyn (2015) 2
 Collingsworth Family, The (2008) 5
Connie Smith (2008)
The Crabb Family (2001–) 7
Cynthia Clawson (1995–) 20
Dallas Holm (1995–) 3
Danny Funderburk (1999)
Danny Gaither (1993–2000*) 4 (died April 6, 2001)
 Daryl Williams Trio (1993–) 2
 Dave Ponder (2000)
 David Will (2008)
David Phelps (1998–) 30
 Dean Brown (1995)
 Debra Talley (1993–) 4
Delores Washington (2004)
 Destiny McGuire (2013)
 Dixie Melody Boys (1999)
Don Francisco (2001)
 Donnie Sumner (1996–) 7
 Dony McGuire (1994–) 2
Dorinda Clark-Cole (2004)
Doris Akers (1994*) (died July 26, 1995)
Dottie Rambo (1992–2008*) 5 (died May 11, 2008)
 Doug Oldham (1993–1999*) 6 (died July 21, 2010)
 Doug Young (1998)
 Dove Brothers (2000–) 2
Doyle Lawson and Quicksilver (1999–) 3
Earl Weatherford (1992*) (died June 17, 1992)
 Ed Enoch (1994–) 2
 Eldridge Fox (1999*) (died Nov. 21, 2002)
 Ernie Haase (1996–) 9
 Ernie Haase & Signature Sound (2005–) 15
 Eva Mae LeFevre (1991–2009*) 11 (died May 18, 2009)
Evie (2000–) 4
Fairfield Four (1993)
 Faye Speer (1995–*) 3 (died October 13, 2015)
Florida Boys (1994–) 8
Franklin Graham (2005)
Gaither Vocal Band (1991–) 57
 Gary Koreiba (1999)
 Gary McSpadden (1993–2020*) 3 (died April 15, 2020)
Gatlin Brothers (1991–) 7
 Gayle Mayes West (2002–) 2
Gene McDonald (1998–) 23
George Beverly Shea (2001–2011*) 4 (died April 16, 2013)
George Jones (2008*) 2 (died April 26, 2013)
George Younce (1991–2005*) 25 (died April 11, 2005)
Gerald Wolfe (1993–) 2
Geron Davis (1995–)
 Ginger Laxon (1998)
Glen Payne  (1991–1999*) 10 (died October 15, 1999)
Glenn Dustin (2009)
Gloria Gaither  (1991–) 28
Gold City (1998–) 3
Gordon Mote (2007–) 12
 Gordon Stoker (1993–2013*) 2 (died March 27, 2013)
Grascals (2008–) 2
Greater Vision (2000–) 5
 Greenes, The (2001–) 3
Guy Penrod (1995–) 38
 Hayes Family, The (1996–) 9
Henry Slaughter (1996*) (died Nov. 13, 2020)
Hoppers, The (1993–) 21
Hovie Lister (1991–2002*) 8 (died Dec. 28, 2001)
Howard Goodman (1991–2002*) 17 (died Nov. 30, 2002)
The Isaacs (1996–) 41
Ivan Parker (1995–) 31
J. D. Sumner (1991–1999*) 18 (died Nov. 16, 1998)
 Jack Toney (1996–2004*) 11 (died April 15, 2004)
Jake Hess (1991–2004*) 39 (died Jan. 4, 2004)
James Blackwood (1991–2002*) 10 (died Feb. 3, 2002)
Jamie Grace (2013) 2
 Jan Buckner (1998–) 2
Janet Paschal (1993–) 26
Jason Crabb (2004–) 8
 Jeanne Johnson (1994–) 19
 Jeff Allen (2000–) 4
Jeff & Sheri Easter (1994–) 33
 Jeff Easter (1994–) 7
 Jeff Gibson (1994)
 Jeff Silvey (1998)
Jessy Dixon (1996–2008*) 46 (died Sept. 26, 2011)
 Jim Hamill (1996–*) 4 (died Nov. 29, 2007)
 Jim Hill (1991–*) 7 (died Jan. 9, 2018)
 Jim Murray (1991–) 7
 Jimmy Blackwood (1995–) 5
Jimmy Dean (2009*) (died June 13, 2010)
Jimmy Fortune (2008–) 2
 Joel Hemphill (1995–) 4
 John Hall (1995–2020*) 4 (died Sept. 29, 2020)
John Starnes (1995–) 7
Johnny Cook (1993*) 2 (died May 14, 2000)
Johnny Minick (1996–) 10
 Jon Mohr (2009–) 2
 Jonathan Martin (1996–) 2
Jonathan Pierce (1996–2020*) 3 (died May 10, 2020)
Joni Eareckson Tada (2003)
Joni Lamb (2008)
 Joy Gardner (1993–) 44
 Joyce Martin Sanders (1994–) 7
 Judy Martin Hess (2011, 2016) 2
 Karen Apple (1993–) 2
 Karen Peck (1995–) 10
Karen Peck and New River (1998–) 10
Karen Wheaton (1996–) 4
Katinas, The (1999–) 2
 Kelly Bowling (2013)
Kelly Nelon (1993–) 3
 Ken Davis (1998–) 4
 Ken Eubanks (1994)
Kenny Bishop (1995)
 Kevin Spencer Family (1999)
 Kevin Williams (1999–) 7
 Kim Collingsworth (2009)
 Kim Hopper (1998–) 25
Kingsmen Quartet (1998–) 2
Kirk Talley (1996–) 4
Kristyn Getty (2013) 2
 Labreeska Hemphill (1993–2015*) 2 (died Dec. 9, 2015)
 Ladye Love Smith (1998–) 30
 Lari White (1998*) (died Jan. 23, 2018)
Larnelle Harris (1994–) 20
 Larry Ford (1992–) 26
Larry Gatlin (1991–) 6
Larry Sparks (2008–) 2
 Lauren Talley (2000–) 6
 Lee Young (2009)
Legacy Five (2001–) 6
Les Beasley (1993–2018*) 2 (died Nov. 18, 2018)
Lewis Family (1999–) 4
 Lillie Knauls (1993–) 26
Lily Fern Weatherford (1992–) 5
 Lisa Daggs (1996–) 5
 LordSong (2005–) 2
Lulu Roman (1998–) 4
Lynda Randle (1996–) 31
Mark Lowry (1991–) 39
Mark Trammell (1999)
Marshall Hall (2000–) 13
The Martins (1995–) 25
Marty Stuart (2008–) 2
Mary Mary (2004)
Mary Tom Speer Reid (1995–2014*) 11 (died Sept. 16, 2014)
Meadowlark Lemon (1999–*) 2 (died Dec. 27, 2015)
 Mel Tunney (2002)
Michael English (1991–) 19
Michael Sykes (2000–) 5
Michael Tait (2006–) 2
Michael W. Smith (2001)
Mighty Clouds Of Joy (2004)
 Mike Allen (1998–) 22
 Mike Bowling (2004)
 Mom Winans (2004)
Mylon LeFevre (1992–) 3
 Nancy Harmon (1996)
 Naomi Sego (1993-2009*) (died Nov. 3, 2017)
Natalie Grant (2002–) 3
 Neil Pope (1998–)
 Nelons, The (1995–) 12
Nitty Gritty Dirt Band (2008)
Oak Ridge Boys (2002–) 6
Old Time Gospel Hour Quartet (2004)
The Peasall Sisters (2005)
Perrys, The (2009)
 Pfeifers (2001)
 R. W. Blackwood Jr. (2000)
Ralph Stanley (2003–2008*) 4 (died June 23, 2016)
Randy Owen (2007–) 2
 Randy Phillips (1996)
Randy Travis (2001–) 3
 Ray Dean Reese (1996–) 3
Reba Rambo-McGuire (1994–) 3
 Reggie Saddler Family (1998–) 4
 Reggie Smith (1998–) 33
Rex Nelon (1994–2000*) 16 (died Jan. 24, 2000)
Rhonda Vincent & The Rage (2008–) 2
 Rick Evans (2008)
Ricky Skaggs (2001)
 Robbie Hiner (1996–) 4
Roger Bennett (1999*) (died March 17, 2007)
 Roger McDuff  (1995–) 2
 Roger Talley (1993-)
Ronnie Milsap (2010)
 Rosa Nell Speer  (1991–2008*) 3 (died May 16, 2016)
 Rosie Rozell (1995*) (died Feb. 28, 1995)
 Ruppes (1998–) 2
Russ Taff (1992–) 33
Sandi Patty (1999–) 6
 Sarah DeLane (2001–) 4
Selah (2005)
 Shane McConnell (2007–) 10
 Sheri Easter (1994–) 12
Sherman Andrus (2002–) 2
Shirley Murdock (2004)
Smokie Norful (2004)
Sonya Isaacs (1996–) 17
Speer Family (1991–) 6
Squire Parsons (1993–) 18
 Stamps Quartet (1991–) 6
Stan Whitmire (2004–) 3
Statesmen Quartet (1996–) 2
Statler Brothers (1990)
 Stephen Hill (1998–2012*) 30 (died August 5, 2012)
Steve Green (2009)
 Steve "Rabbit" Easter (2008)
 Steve Weatherford (1993)
 Suzanne Gaither–Jennings (1999)
T.D. Jakes (2004–) 2
Talley Trio (2000–) 14
 The Martin Family Circus (2016–) 2
 Tanya Goodman Sykes (1992–) 26
 TaRanda Greene (2001–) 10
Taylor Mason (2002–) 3
Terri Gibbs (1996)
Terry Blackwood (1995–) 33
Terry Bradshaw (1996)
 Terry Franklin (1992)
 Terry McMillan (musician)  (1998–*) 2 (died Feb. 2, 2007)
 Testify (Christian band) (2000 -2004)
 Three Bridges (2008–) 2
 Tim Lovelace (1997)
Tim Parton (1996–) 3
 Tim Pettigo (1995)
Tim Riley  (2000)
Tramaine Hawkins (2004–) 2
 Triumphant Quartet (2011)
Vestal Goodman (1991–2003*) 38 (died Dec. 27, 2003)
Vince Gill (2008–) 2
Voices of Lee (2006)
 Wally Varner (1992–1993*) 2 (died Dec. 28, 2004)
 Walt Mills (1996-1997)
 Wanda Vick  (1999)
 Wes Hampton (2007–) 7
Wesley Pritchard (1996–) 41
 Willie Wynn (1997–) 2
Wintley Phipps (2001–) 6
Woody Wright (1998–) 20
Zig Ziglar (2001*) (died Nov. 28, 2012)

References

External links
Gaither Homecoming's official web site

Gospel music media
Southern gospel
Southern gospel performers